Nakiska is a ski resort in western Canada, in the Kananaskis Country region of the province of Alberta. "Nakiska" is a Cree word meaning "to meet" or "meeting place."

Nakiska is owned by Resorts of the Canadian Rockies, which also owns the Fernie, Kimberley, Kicking Horse Mountain Resort, Mont Sainte Anne, and Stoneham ski resorts.

History
The site was selected in 1983 and opened for skiing in the fall of 1986, in preparation for the 1988 Winter Olympics. Pre-Olympic races on the North American Cup circuit (Nor-Am) were held in December 1986 and World Cup downhill and super G races were held in March 1987.

At the 1988 Winter Olympics, Nakiska hosted the ten alpine events, as well as freestyle moguls skiing, then a demonstration event. A temporary surface lift to the gusty top of the mountain was used for the men's downhill event. This poma can be seen from the top of the "Gold Chair" and is sometimes used for avalanche control. That race was postponed a day due to  winds at the summit.

In 2008, Nakiska was named the official training centre of Alpine Canada (ACA). Each year Nakiska welcomes alpine teams from around the world for early season ski training. During the summer of 2008 the ski area embarked on a series of renovations. Snowmaking enhancements increased capacity by 33%. The 100 metre Monster Magic Carpet was added and the creation of a dedicated Training Run was completed on Mapmaker.

In 2009, in preparation for the 2010 Olympics in Vancouver, more enhancements occurred. A new high-speed quad lift was installed (Gold Chair Express), replacing the original fixed-grip (Gold) triple chairlift. The ride time is 4.7 minutes, less than half of the previous chair's 9.7 minutes.

In 2009 new ski trails were also created with the addition of the new Monster Glades (trails in the trees).

The Olympic flame still burns at the entrance to the resort. Of note is that the men's downhill shown on the board inside the restaurant is not the actual run used. With test skiers saying the proposed run was too easy, the men's downhill course was changed with only 3 days to go, leaving no time to change the course board which has already been painted and mounted on the wall inside the restaurant.

On November 13, 2017, the French Alpine ski racer David Poisson died in a crash during training.

Climate
A weather station located west of the ski area records temperature and wind speed. It has reported wind gusts as high as

See also
List of ski areas and resorts in Canada
1988 Winter Olympics

References

Further reading

External links

1988 trail map – Olympic runs
Resorts of the Canadian Rockies – company site

Venues of the 1988 Winter Olympics
Olympic alpine skiing venues
Olympic freestyle skiing venues
Ski areas and resorts in Alberta
Kananaskis Improvement District